Ryszard Pasiewicz (born 4 March 1955) is a Polish boxer. He competed in the men's middleweight event at the 1976 Summer Olympics.

References

1955 births
Living people
Polish male boxers
Olympic boxers of Poland
Boxers at the 1976 Summer Olympics
Sportspeople from Łódź
Middleweight boxers